Randell Harrevelt (born 8 January 1993 in the Netherlands) is an Aruban international footballer who plays for Pallo-Iirot in Finland.

Career

Harrevelt started his senior career with Excelsior Veldwezelt. After that, he played for Vestri, Pietà Hotspurs, Dumlupınar TSK, Sollentuna FK, Anduud City, CS Știința Miroslava, and Pallo-Iirot, where he now plays. He represented Aruba internationally in 2019, with three caps and zero goals.

References

External links 
 Hoe de Nederlandse Randell Harrevelt een sterspeler werd in Mongolië 
 Harrevelt op zoek naar nieuwe uitdaging: “Voelde mezelf niet meer welkom” 
 Randell Harrevelt speelde in Mongolië: ‘WTF, wist niet eens dat daar voetbal was’ 
 Het voetbalavontuur van Randell Harrevelt vol botte pech en louche zaakwaarnemers 
 Harrevelt maakt transfer naar Finland: “Spelen voor het kampioenschap” 

Living people
1993 births
Dutch footballers
Aruban footballers
Aruba international footballers
Pietà Hotspurs F.C. players
Sollentuna FK players
Anduud City FC players
Mongolian National Premier League players
Footballers from Amsterdam
Expatriate footballers in Belgium
Expatriate footballers in Iceland
Expatriate footballers in Malta
Expatriate footballers in Turkey
Expatriate footballers in Sweden
Expatriate footballers in Mongolia
Association football forwards